Sir Charles Bine Renshaw, 1st Baronet (9 December 1848 – 6 March 1918) was a Scottish Conservative and Unionist Party politician.

He was born in Sussex and came to Glasgow in 1870 to work in a senior position with Stoddard Carpets, later marrying the boss's daughter, Mary Stoddard. In 1882 he took over Stoddard Carpets International, founded by his father-in-law, Arthur Francis Stoddard.

He was elected at the 1892 general election as the member of parliament (MP) for West Renfrewshire, and held the seat until he retired from Parliament at the 1906 general election.

He was created a Baronet in 1903, of Coldharbour, Surrey.

He was later chairman of the Caledonian Railway Company.

He was succeeded by his son Sir Charles Stephen Bine Renshaw 2nd.

He is buried near the family home of in Elderslie in Renfrewshire.

References

External links 
 
Short biography of Sir Charles Renshaw, 1st Baronet

1848 births
1918 deaths
Scottish Tory MPs (pre-1912)
Members of the Parliament of the United Kingdom for Scottish constituencies
UK MPs 1892–1895
UK MPs 1895–1900
UK MPs 1900–1906
Baronets in the Baronetage of the United Kingdom
Directors of the Caledonian Railway